American country and Christian music artist Cristy Lane has released 18 studio albums, 23 compilation albums, one video album, one music video, 33 singles and appeared on one album. Lane first recorded for various labels in the 1960s. In the 1970s, Lane's husband formed his own label titled LS Records and she recorded exclusively for the company. In 1977, Lane had her first charting singles on the Billboard country songs chart. This was followed by 1977's "Let Me Down Easy," which reached the top ten and became her first major country hit. She had further top ten country hits that year with "I'm Gonna Love You Anyway" and "Penny Arcade". Her first LS album was released in 1978 titled Cristy Lane Is the Name and featured her major hits from the year. In 1978, she had a top five hit with the single "I Just Can't Stay Married to You" and it appeared on her next studio album titled Love Lies. The album was her first to reach the Billboard country albums chart. In 1979, Lane switched to United Artists Records and had three more hits, including the top ten country single "Simple Little Words".

In 1980, Lane's cover of the Christian piece titled "One Day at a Time" reached number one on the country chart. The song became the most commercially-successful single of her music career and became a hit in multiple countries. It was followed by Lane's final top ten country hit called "Sweet Sexy Eyes". Both singles appeared on her 1980 studio album called Ask Me to Dance, which reached number 14 on the country albums chart. In 1981, Lane's cover of ABBA's "I Have a Dream" reached the top 20 and appeared on an album of the same name. She continued recording for her label through the 1980s. With United Artists (re-named Liberty Records), Lane released Here's to Us (1982) and Footprints in the Sand (1983). Both studio albums were her final to chart on the Billboard country LP's chart. Lane and her husband also began marketing music on television. The marketing strategy allowed Lane to continue releasing compilation albums through the 1990s and 2000s. Among her more recent compilations, 22 All Time Favorites, reached the Billboard country albums chart, peaking at number 62.

Albums

Studio albums

Compilation albums

Singles

Videography

Music videos

Video albums

Other album appearances

Notes

References

External links
 Cristy Lane music at her official website

Country music discographies
Discographies of American artists
Christian music discographies